Hughey Run is a  long 1st order tributary to Bilger Run in Clearfield County, Pennsylvania.  This is the only stream of this name in the United States.  Hughey Run has been and continues to impacted by acid mine drainage (AMD), though not to the extent of Kratzer Run.

Course 
Hughey Run rises in a pond about 1 mile west of Greenville, Pennsylvania, and then flows generally southeast to join Bilger Run about 0.5 miles south of Greenville.

Watershed 
Hughey Run drains  of area, receives about 44.6 in/year of precipitation, has a wetness index of 427.37, and is about 73% forested.

See also 
 List of Pennsylvania Rivers

References

Watershed Map 

Rivers of Pennsylvania
Rivers of Clearfield County, Pennsylvania